is a Japanese professional baseball outfielder for the Tohoku Rakuten Golden Eagles of Nippon Professional Baseball as a development player.

Professional career
On October 27, 2011, Kamamoto was drafted as a developmental player by the Fukuoka Softbank Hawks in the 2011 Nippon Professional Baseball draft.

2012–2020 season
On June 1, 2012, Kamamoto underwent surgery for a broken left hand.

In 2012 - 2015 season, he played in informal matches against Shikoku Island League Plus's teams and amateur baseball teams, and played in the Western League of NPB's minor leagues.

On July 31, 2015, Kamamoto signed a 6 million yen contract with the Fukuoka SoftBank Hawks as a registered player under control

On September 14, 2016, Kamamoto debuted against the Tohoku Rakuten Golden Eagles. And he was honored with the 2016 Western League Most Stolen base Leader Award.

In 2017 season, Kamamoto played two games in the Pacific League. And he recorded a 26 stolen bases in the Western League and was honored with the 2017 Western League Most Stolen base Leader Award and 2017 Western League Excellent Player Award.

In 2018 season, Kamamoto played 6 games in the Pacific League.

On April 6, 2019, Kamamoto recorded his first hit against Chiba Lotte Marines. On the 7th of the following day, he recorded his first home run. 
In the 2019 season, he finished the regular season in 86 games with a batting average of .270, a 4 home runs, a 11 stolen bases.

In 2020 season, Kamamoto finished the regular season in 32 games with a batting average of .192, and a RBI of 2.  And he was selected as the Japan Series roster in the 2020 Japan Series.

References

External links

NPB.jp
60 Go Kamamoto PLAYERS2021 - Fukuoka SoftBank Hawks Official site

1993 births
Living people
Fukuoka SoftBank Hawks players
Japanese expatriate baseball players in Puerto Rico
Nippon Professional Baseball outfielders
Baseball people from Nagasaki Prefecture
Gigantes de Carolina players
Tohoku Rakuten Golden Eagles players